Gera (also known as Gerawa or Fyandigeri) is an Afro-Asiatic language spoken in Nigeria. Speakers are shifting to Hausa.

There are at least 30 villages. Many Gera villages no longer speak the language. A 2018 survey suggested there are only 4 villages where the language is being passed on to children.

Notes 

West Chadic languages
Languages of Nigeria